La Palme Sportive de Tozeur or LPS Tozeur, is a football club from Tozeur in Tunisia. Founded in 1945, the team plays in green and yellow colours.

The club currently plays in Tunisian Ligue Professionnelle 3.

Honours
Tunisian Ligue Professionnelle 3: 1991, 1999, 2009
Tunisian Ligue Amateur 4: 2008

Managers
Lotfi Kadri (July 1, 2013 – Jan 4, 2014)
Abdeljalil Ghali (interim) (Jan 5, 2014 – Jan 8, 2014)
Khaled Ben Sassi (Jan 9, 2014 – March 11, 2014)
Sofiène Hidoussi (March 13, 2014–)

References

External links
Worldfootball
Club logo

Football clubs in Tunisia
Association football clubs established in 1945
1945 establishments in Tunisia
Sports clubs in Tunisia